Candacia is a genus of copepods in the order Calanoida. It is the only genus in the monotypic family Candaciidae.

Species
The following species are recognised in the genus Candacia:

Candacia armata 
Candacia bipinnata 
Candacia bispinosa 
Candacia bradyi 
Candacia catula 
Candacia cheirura 
Candacia columbiae 
Candacia curta 
Candacia discaudata 
Candacia elongata 
Candacia ethiopica 
Candacia falcifera 
Candacia giesbrechti 
Candacia ginuensis 
Candacia guggenheimi 
Candacia ishimarui 
Candacia ketchumi 
Candacia longimana 
Candacia magna 
Candacia maxima 
Candacia pachydactyla 
Candacia paenelongimana 
Candacia parafalcifera 
Candacia pofi 
Candacia samassae 
Candacia simplex 
Candacia tenuimana 
Candacia truncata 
Candacia tuberculata 
Candacia varicans 
Candacia worthingtoni

References 

Calanoida